"Roseibacula" is an aerobic, alkaliphilic and non-motile genus of bacteria from the family of Rhodobacteraceae with one known species ("Roseibacula alcaliphilum"). Roseibacula alcaliphilum has been isolated from water from the lake Doroninskoe in Russia.

References

Rhodobacteraceae
Bacteria genera
Monotypic bacteria genera